Random House is an American book publisher and the largest general-interest paperback publisher in the world. The company has several independently managed subsidiaries around the world. It is part of Penguin Random House, which is owned by German media conglomerate Bertelsmann.

History
Random House was founded in 1927 by Bennett Cerf and Donald Klopfer, two years after they acquired the Modern Library imprint from publisher Horace Liveright, which reprints classic works of literature. Cerf is quoted as saying, "We just said we were going to publish a few books on the side at random," which suggested the name Random House. In 1934, they published the first authorized edition of James Joyce's novel Ulysses in the Anglophone world. Ulysses transformed Random House into a formidable publisher over the next two decades. In 1936, it absorbed the firm of Smith and Haas—Robert Haas became the third partner until retiring and selling his share back to Cerf and Klopfer in 1956—which added authors including William Faulkner, Isak Dinesen, André Malraux, Robert Graves, and Jean de Brunhoff, who wrote the Babar children's books. Random House also hired editors Harry Maule, Robert Linscott, and Saxe Commins, and they brought authors such as Sinclair Lewis and Robert Penn Warren with them.

Random House entered reference publishing in 1947 with the American College Dictionary, which was followed in 1966 by its first unabridged dictionary.

In October 1959, Random House went public at $11.25 a share. This move drew other publishing companies, such as Simon & Schuster, to later go public. American publishers Alfred A. Knopf, Inc. and Beginner Books were acquired by Random House in 1960 and Pantheon Books in 1961; works continue to be published under these imprints with editorial independence, such as Everyman's Library, a series of classical literature reprints.

In 1965, RCA bought Random House as part of a diversification strategy. Random House acquired the paperback book publisher Ballantine Books in 1973. RCA sold Random House to Advance Publications in 1980.

In 1985, Random House began publishing audiobooks. In 1988, Random House acquired Crown Publishing Group. Also in 1988, McGraw-Hill acquired Random House's Schools and Colleges division. In 1998, Bertelsmann AG bought Random House and merged it with Bantam Doubleday Dell and it soon went global. In 1999, Random House acquired the children's audiobook publisher Listening Library. In 1999, Random House sold its distribution division. Phyllis E. Grann joined Random House as vice-chairman in 2001. Grann was the CEO for Putnam and had grown that house from $10 million in revenue in 1976, to more than $200 million by 1993 and without increasing their title output. A publishing insider commented that then CEO Peter Olson was, "I think maybe instead of buying a company he bought a person." Random House reentered the distribution business in 2003.

Coinciding with the 2007–2008 financial crisis, the publishing industry was hit hard with weak retail sales. In May 2008, Random House CEO Peter Olson stepped down and Bertelsmann replaced Olson with Markus Dohle. By October of that year, Doubleday, a division of Random House announced that they would lay off 16 people or about 10% of its workforce.

In early December 2008, what became known as Black Wednesday in publishing circles, many publishers including Random House took steps by restructuring their divisions and laying off employees. The reorganization consolidated and created three divisions—Random House Publishing Group, Knopf Doubleday Publishing Group and Crown Publishing Group.Susan Kamil, was named editorial director for Dial Press and editor-in-chief of Random House imprints reporting to Gina Centrello, the president and publisher of the Random House Publishing Group. There were layoffs in the Doubleday imprint (now part of Knopf Publishing Group) and Dial Press, Bantam Dell, and Spiegel & Grau were moved from Doubleday over to the Random House imprints. Random House also has an entertainment production arm for film and television, Random House Studio; one release in 2011 was One Day. The company also creates story content for media including video games, social networks on the web, and mobile platforms. It is one of the largest English-language publishers, along with the group formerly known as the "Big 6", now known as the "Big Five". In October 2012, Bertelsmann entered into talks with rival conglomerate Pearson plc, over the possibility of combining their respective publishing companies, Random House and Penguin Group.

The merger was completed on July 1, 2013, and the new company is Penguin Random House. When founded, Bertelsmann owned 53% of the joint venture while Pearson owned 47%. Pearson sold 22% of its shares to Bertelsmann in July 2017, and since April 2020, it is a wholly owned subsidiary of Bertelsmann, making Random House division again wholly owned by German parent. At the time of the acquisition the combined companies controlled 25% of the book business with more than 10,000 employees and 250 independent publishing imprints and with about $3.9 billion in annual revenues. The move to consolidate was to provide leverage against Amazon.com and battle the shrinking state of bookstores. In October 2018, Penguin Random House merged two of its most known publishing lines, Random House and the Crown Publishing Group. According to Madeline McIntosh, chief executive of Penguin Random House U.S., the two lines "will retain their distinct editorial identities."

McIntosh explained some of the motivation behind the merger in a memo to employees, writing, "Book discovery and buying patterns continue to shift, resulting in growth opportunities in the nonfiction categories in which Crown in particular already has a strong foothold: food, lifestyle, health, wellness, business, and Christian." "We must invest even more aggressively in title-level and scaled marketing programs, capabilities and partnerships," she added. Detailing additional growth strategies, McIntosh explained of the merger, "We will need to do two things simultaneously. First, we must expand and strengthen the expert publishing teams who are specialized in and dedicated to each category. Second, we must invest even more aggressively in title-level and scaled marketing programs, capabilities, and partnerships. This will ensure that we not only maximize the sales for each individual book but also keep pace with consumer trends."

In 2019, Penguin Random House acquired British children's book publisher Little Tiger Group (including American subsidiary Tiger Tales Press) and added it to Random House Children's Books.

Organization

Headquarters 
The publisher's main office in the United States is located at 1745 Broadway in Manhattan, in the 684-foot – 210 m Penguin Random House Tower, completed in 2009 and spanning the entire west side of the block between West 55th Street and West 56th. Its lobby showcases floor-to-ceiling glassed-in bookcases filled with books published by the company's many imprints. Earlier addresses were 457 Madison Avenue, New York 22, NY; 20 East 57th Street, New York 22, NY; and 201 East 50th Street, New York, NY 10022.

International branches 
Random House, Inc. maintains several independently managed subsidiaries around the world.

The Random House Group is one of the largest general book publishing companies in the United Kingdom; it is based in London.

The Group comprises nine publishing companies: Cornerstone Publishing, Vintage Publishing, Ebury Publishing, Transworld Publishers, Penguin Random House Children's, Penguin Random House UK Audio, Penguin Michael Joseph, Penguin Press, and Penguin General. Its distribution business services its own imprints, as well as 40 other UK publishers through Grantham Book Services.

The Random House archive and library is located in Rushden in Northamptonshire.

In 1989, Century Hutchinson was folded into the British Random House Group, briefly known as Random Century (1990–92), Century became an imprint of the group's Cornerstone Publishing.

The Random House Group also operates branches in Australia, New Zealand, South Africa (as a joint venture under the name Random House Struik), and India as part of its overseas structure. In Australia offices are in Sydney and Melbourne. In New Zealand it is based in Glenfield, Auckland, while Random House's Indian headquarters are located in New Delhi.

Verlagsgruppe Random House was established after Bertelsmann's 1998 acquisition of Random House, grouping its German imprints (until then operating as Verlagsgruppe Bertelsmann) under the new name; before April 2020, it has explicitly no legal part of the worldwide Penguin Random House company and a hundred percent subsidiary of Bertelsmann instead but de facto is led by the same management. It is the second largest book publisher in Germany with more than 40 imprints, including historic publishing houses Goldmann and Heyne Verlag, as well as C. Bertelsmann, the publishing house from which today's Bertelsmann SE & Co. KGaA would eventually evolve. Verlagsgruppe Random House is headquartered in Munich (with additional locations in Gütersloh (where Bertelsmann is headquartered), Cologne, and Aßlar), employs about 850 people, and publishes roughly 2,500 titles per year. Following the formation of Penguin Random House, a Penguin Verlag (with no legal connection to Penguin Books) was founded for the German market in 2015, as part of the Verlagsgruppe Random House. With Bertelsmann acquiring full ownership of Penguin Random House in April 2020, Verlagsgruppe Random House is being reintegrated with the main Penguin Random House company.

Penguin Random House Grupo Editorial is Random House's Spanish-language division, targeting markets in Spain and Hispanic America. It is headquartered in Barcelona with locations in Argentina, Chile, Colombia, Mexico, Venezuela, Uruguay, and the United States. From 2001 until November 2012, it was a joint venture with Italian publisher Mondadori (Random House Mondadori). Upon Bertelsmann's acquisition of Mondadori's stake in the JV, the name was kept temporarily four months. Some Spanish-language authors published by Penguin Random House Grupo Editorial include Roberto Bolaño, Javier Marías, Mario Vargas Llosa and Guillermo Arriaga.

Random House of Canada was established in 1944 as the Canadian distributor of Random House Books. In 1986 the company established its own indigenous Canadian publishing program that has become one of the most successful in Canadian history. Until January 2012, it used to hold a 25% stake in McClelland & Stewart, with the remaining 75% being controlled by the University of Toronto. It is now the sole owner of McClelland & Stewart.

Takeda Random House Japan was founded in May 2003 as a joint venture between Kodansha and Random House. In 2009, Random House discontinued the joint venture. The company filed for bankruptcy on December 14, 2012.

In 2006, Random House invested in Random House Korea. In 2010, Random House divested their ownership.

On April 27, 2010, Random House announced that Random House Australia managing director, Margie Seale, would take on the responsibilities of exploring and evaluating potential business opportunities in Asia.

Home video division

Random House Home Video 
Random House Home Video was a home video unit established by Random House in 1983 as Random House Video until 1988, the publisher of Dr. Seuss's books. It was renamed in 1984. Random House's home video division was currently the distributor of some shows, such as Sesame Street (1986–2005), The Busy World of Richard Scarry (1993–2005), Arthur (1996–2006), and The Berenstain Bears, the original 1985–1987 animated television series (1989–2005, 2008–2009), and Golden Books (2001–2005). In 1994, they began distributing through Sony Wonder. However, the company went dormant around 2005, but Sony Wonder still continued to use the company's logo on Arthur VHS tapes and DVDs until 2006.

See also 

 Western Publishing
 List of English language book publishers
 List of largest UK book publishers
 Media of New York City

References

External links 
 
 
 Finding aid to Random House records at Columbia University. Rare Book & Manuscript Library.
 Who Speaks for the Negro Vanderbilt documentary website

 
Book publishing companies based in New York (state)
Publishing companies based in New York City
Publishing companies established in 1927
1927 establishments in New York (state)
Bertelsmann subsidiaries
Book publishing companies of the United States
1998 mergers and acquisitions
American subsidiaries of foreign companies